Affion Crockett (born August 12, 1974) is an American actor and comedian.

Early life
Crockett was raised in Germany and Fayetteville, North Carolina.

Career
Crockett appeared in HBO's Def Comedy Jam in 1996, demonstrating his impressions and physical comedy. He was a cast member of the game show Wild 'n Out, starring Nick Cannon. He has appeared on Curb Your Enthusiasm, Blackish, co-starred in the films A Haunted House 1 & 2 with Marlon Wayans, Welcome Home Roscoe Jenkins with Martin Lawrence, Soul Men with Samuel L. Jackson and Bernie Mac, The Wedding Ringer with Kevin Hart and Josh Gad, and Pixels with Adam Sandler. In 2016, Affion was a contestant playing for charity, on Season 3, episode 18 of the game show idiotest

Crockett starred in and produced his own sketch comedy show for Fox titled In the Flow with Affion Crockett, which was executive produced by Jamie Foxx. He wrote, produced, and rapped on his debut comedy album, Watch the Clone.

He hosted a reunion special for the TV series Martin titled Martin: The Reunion that aired June 16, 2022 on BET+.

Filmography

Film/Movie

Television

Video Game

References

External links
Official website

1974 births
American people of Trinidad and Tobago descent
American people of Chinese descent
African-American male comedians
American male comedians
Comedians from North Carolina
American male film actors
American male television actors
Fayetteville State University alumni
Living people
Musicians from Fayetteville, North Carolina
21st-century American comedians
21st-century African-American people
20th-century African-American people